Salomon's House (or Solomon's House) is a fictional institution in Sir Francis Bacon's utopian work New Atlantis, published in English in 1777, years after Bacon's death. In this work, Bacon portrays a vision of the future of human discovery and knowledge. Salomon's House is credited with being the standard upon which 17th century scientific academies, including the French Académie des Sciences and the English Royal Society, are based.

Historical Context 
It is speculated that Bacon was inspired by contemporary men of science Cornelis Drebbel and Salomon de Caus, as well as author and courtier Sir Thomas Chaloner.

According to the "Note on the Texts" in the revised critical edition, the original 1627 edition published by Bacon's literary executor William Rawley has "King Solamona" and "Salomon's House", while the 1658 and 1670 editions (long after Bacon's death) have "King Salomona" and "Solomon's House." The idea inspired followers like Samuel Hartlib and Robert Boyle and led to the Royal Society of 1660.

Description of Salomon's House 
A Father of Salomon's House explains the founding of Salomon's House by King Solamona:"Ye shall understand (my dear friends) that amongst the excellent acts of that king, one above all hath the pre-eminence. It was the erection and institution of an Order or Society, which we call "Salomon's House"; the noblest foundation (as we think) that ever was upon the earth; and the lanthorn of this kingdom. It is dedicated to the study of the Works and Creatures of God. Some think it beareth the founder's name a little corrupted, as if it should be Solamona's House. But the records write it as it is spoken. So as I take it to be denominate of the King of the Hebrews, which is famous with you, and no stranger to us."Exposition on Salomon's House is divided into four major sections: purpose, structures and equipment, roles, and ordinances and rites.

Purpose 
The purpose of Salomon's House, or "end of [the] foundation," is as stated: "The End of our Foundation is the knowledge of Causes, and secret motions of things; and the enlarging of the bounds of Human Empire, to the effecting of all things possible."

Structures and Equipment 
Salomon's House in Bensalem includes the following structures and materials in order as presented in the text:

Roles 
Roles of members of Salomon's House are listed in order of appearance in the text below:

There are two notable imbalances in the information given. Firstly, the imbalance between the amount of equipment and the amount of manpower to operate it. Secondly, the ratio of roles collecting data to roles producing data.

Ordinances and Rites 
The ordinances and rites followed by the members of Salomon's House are described below:

Galleries 
First Gallery includes the patterns and samples of notable inventions.

Second Gallery holds statues of notable inventors. Notably, the only inventor mentioned by name is Columbus, who is credited with discovering the West Indies. The other inventors are listed as the inventor of their invention. Statues in this gallery are made of various materials including but not limited to brass, marble, cedar, silver, and gold.

Hymns and Services 
Daily hymns and services include praising God as well as requesting His aid.

Circuits and Visits 
Members of the Salomon's house travel throughout the kingdom and perform three major actions. Firstly, they publish new inventions. Secondly, they divine natural disasters. Thirdly, they counsel the populace.

References

External links

Project Gutenberg e-text of Francis Bacon's book The New Atlantis.
Royal Society

Works by Francis Bacon (philosopher)
Fictional universities and colleges